Liechtenstein competed at the 1984 Winter Olympics in Sarajevo, Yugoslavia.

Medalists

Alpine skiing

Men

Women

Hanni Wenzel, a double gold medalist in 1980, was banned from these Olympics by the International Ski Federation (FIS)for accepting promotional payments directly, rather than through the Liechtenstein ski federation.

Cross-country skiing

Men

Luge

Men

References

Official Olympic Reports
International Olympic Committee results database
 Olympic Winter Games 1984, full results by sports-reference.com

Nations at the 1984 Winter Olympics
1984
1984 in Liechtenstein